The Boys of Summer may refer to one of several literary and musical works:
 The Boys of Summer (book), a 1972 book by Roger Kahn
 "The Boys of Summer" (song), a 1984 song by Don Henley, also covered by DJ Sammy and The Ataris
 "Boys of Summer" (The Wire), an episode of The Wire
 Boys of Summer (comics), a manga comic
 "I See the Boys of Summer", a poem by Dylan Thomas

See also
 Girls of Summer